The St Marys District Band Club Pipes and Drums is a pipe band, based in the Suburb of St Marys, New South Wales. The band has been competing in the Australian Pipe Band Championships since it was formed in 1964 and has obtained successful results. From 2005, the band competed in the World Pipe Band Championships.

In 2005 the band achieved 11th place (Grade 2) at the World Championships in Glasgow. In both 2006 and 2007 they came 3rd in the Grade 2 competition at the "Worlds" and were subsequently promoted to Grade 1 by the Australian Pipe Band Association.

In 2008, the band qualified for the Grade 1 final at the World Championships, in which they finished 14th. They also won the Grade 1 title in the Australian Championships in 2008.

References

Grade 1 pipe bands
Pipe bands